Hugo De Grauwe (born 13 April 1954) is a Belgian weightlifter. He competed in the men's middle heavyweight event at the 1980 Summer Olympics.

References

External links
 

1954 births
Living people
Belgian male weightlifters
Olympic weightlifters of Belgium
Weightlifters at the 1980 Summer Olympics
People from Merchtem
Sportspeople from Flemish Brabant
20th-century Belgian people